HD 24160 is a single star in the equatorial constellation of Eridanus. It is visible to the naked eye with an apparent visual magnitude of 4.17. It is moving further from the Earth with a heliocentric radial velocity of +2 km/s. This object is a coronal member of the Ursa Major Moving Group of stars that share a common motion through space.

At the age of 1.76 billion years old, HD 24160 is an evolved G-type giant star with a stellar classification of G7 III, having consumed the hydrogen at its core and tracked away from the main sequence. It has 2.33 times the mass of the Sun and has expanded to about 11 times the Sun's radius. The star is radiating 81.3 times the Sun's luminosity from its enlarged photosphere at an effective temperature of 4,948 K.

References

G-type giants
Eridanus (constellation)
Eridani, g
Durchmusterung objects
024160
017874
1195